{{Infobox academic
| honorific_prefix   = 
| name               = Charles Segal
| honorific_suffix   = 
| image              = 
| image_size         = 
| alt                = 
| caption            = 
| native_name        = 
| native_name_lang   = 
| birth_name         = 
| birth_date         = 
| birth_place        = Boston, Massachusetts
| death_date         = 
| death_place        = Boston, Massachusetts
| death_cause        = 
| region             = 
| nationality        = 
| citizenship        = 
| residence          = 
| other_names        = 
| occupation         = 
| period             = 
| known_for          = 
| home_town          = 
| title              = 
| boards             = 
| spouse             = 
| partner            = 
| children           = 
| parents            =
| relatives          =
| awards             = 
| website            = 
| education          = 
| alma_mater         = Harvard University
| thesis_title       = 
| thesis_url         = 
| thesis_year        = 
| school_tradition   = 
| doctoral_advisor   = 
| academic_advisors  = 
| influences         = Jean-Pierre Vernant  Pierre Vidal-Naquet
| era                = 
| discipline         = Classics
| sub_discipline     = 
| workplaces         = 
| doctoral_students  = 
| notable_students   = 
| main_interests     = 
| notable_works      = Tragedy and Civilization: an Interpretation of Sophocles (1981) 
                       Dionysiac Poetics and Euripides Bacchae' (1982)
| notable_ideas      = 
| influenced         = 
| signature          = 
| signature_alt      = 
| signature_size     = 
| footnotes          = 
}}Charles Paul Segal''' (March 19, 1936 — January 1, 2002) was an American classicist renowned for his application of critical theory to ancient texts. Although his work spanned a variety of Latin and Greek genres, he is best known for his work on Greek tragedy. His most influential work is Tragedy and Civilization: an Interpretation of Sophocles (1981), in which he presents a structuralist approach to Greek theatre.

Career

Segal graduated from Harvard University in 1957 and, four years later, was awarded a doctorate from the same institution for a 900 page thesis on the philosopher Democritus. He held academic positions at Brown University, Princeton University and the University of Pennsylvania, before returning to his alma mater in 1990. There, he served as the Walter C. Klein Professor of Classics until his death in 2002.

Selected publicationsTragedy and Civilization: An Interpretation of Sophocles, University of Oklahoma Press, 1981Dionysiac Poetics and Euripides' Bacchae, Princeton University Press, 1982Orpheus: the Myth of the Poet, Johns Hopkins University Press, 1989Lucretius on Death and Anxiety'', Princeton University Press, 1990

References 

Writers from Boston
Scholars of ancient Greek literature
1936 births
2002 deaths
Classical scholars of Harvard University
Harvard University alumni
20th-century American male writers